Affringues is a commune in the Pas-de-Calais department in northern France. The placename derives from medieval Flemish: Hafferdingen.

Geography
A village, located 9 miles (15 km) southwest of Saint-Omer, at the D205 and D202 crossroads.

History
First mentioned in the 12th century by the names Hafferdinges (+/- 1182) and Harfrenges (1186).

Population

Sights
 The church of St.Leger, dating from the sixteenth century, with a stone spire.

See also
Communes of the Pas-de-Calais department

References

Communes of Pas-de-Calais